Amphilepididae are a small family of brittle stars of the suborder Gnathophiurina. It contains two genera, Amphicutis and Amphilepis 
Amphicutis
Amphilepis

References

 
Gnathophiurina
Echinoderm families